Euseius aizawai is a species of mite in the family Phytoseiidae.

References

aizawai
Articles created by Qbugbot
Animals described in 1977